Nineteen baronetcies have been created for persons with the surname Hamilton, eight in the Baronetage of Nova Scotia, one in the Baronetage of England, five in the Baronetage of Ireland, one in the Baronetage of Great Britain and four in the Baronetage of the United Kingdom. As of 2008 two creations are extant, two are dormant, two are either extinct or dormant and twelve extinct.

Hamilton baronets, of West Port (1627) 
The Hamilton Baronetcy, of West Port, was created in the Baronetage of Nova Scotia in 1627 for the Hon. William Hamilton. He was the third son of James Hamilton, 1st Earl of Abercorn (see the Duke of Abercorn for earlier history of the family). The title became either extinct or dormant on Hamilton's death in circa 1680.
Sir William Hamilton, 1st Baronet (1627 – )

Hamilton baronets, of Killock (1628) 
The Hamilton Baronetcy, of Killock in the County of Down (according to other sources the territorial designation was "of Killaugh in the County of Cavan"), was created in the Baronetage of Nova Scotia on 29 September 1628 for Francis Hamilton. He represented Jamestown and County Cavan in the Irish House of Commons. His son, the second Baronet, was a Member of the Irish Parliament for County Donegal. He was succeeded by his son, the third Baronet. He also represented County Cavan in the Irish Parliament. The title became either extinct or dormant on his death in 1714.

Sir Francis Hamilton, 1st Baronet (died 1673)
Sir Charles Hamilton, 2nd Baronet (died c. 1689)
Sir Francis Hamilton, 3rd Baronet (c. 1637 – 1714)

Hamilton baronets, of Broomhill (1635) 
The Hamilton Baronetcy, of Broomhill, was created in the Baronetage of Nova Scotia on 6 January 1635 for James Hamilton. For more information on this creation, see Lord Belhaven and Stenton. See also the Hamilton Baronetcy of Rosehall below.

Hamilton baronets, of London (1642) 
The Hamilton Baronetcy, of London, was created in the Baronetage of England on 11 May 1642 for John Hamilton. The title became extinct on his death in circa 1670.

Sir John Hamilton, 1st Baronet (died c. 1670)

Hamilton baronets, of Silvertonhill (1646) 
The Hamilton Baronetcy, of Silvertonhill in the County of Lanark, was created in the Baronetage of Nova Scotia in 1646 for Robert Hamilton, a Royalist and favourite of Charles I. He was a descendant of Alexander Hamilton of Silvertonhill, brother of James Hamilton, 1st Lord Hamilton (ancestor of the Dukes of Hamilton and the Dukes of Abercorn).

Sir Robert Hamilton, 1st Baronet (died c. 1670), MP for Lanarkshire (1661–1663).
Col. Sir Robert Hamilton, 2nd Baronet (died 1708), MP for Lanarkshire (1678), served in the Earl of Leven's Regiment.
Sir John Hamilton, 3rd Baronet (died 1748)
Lt-Gen. Sir Robert Hamilton, 4th Baronet (died 1786), colonel of the 108th Regiment in 1762, and from 1770 colonel of the 40th Regiment
Sir Frederic Hamilton, 5th Baronet (1777–1853), who succeeded to the baronetcy directly from his grandfather (his father, John William Hamilton, having predeceased his own father in 1781). According to his father's memorial stone in Chester Cathedral, his father John had been Secretary of the War Department in the Kingdom of Ireland's government, and Frederic was one of eight legitimate children he had with his wife Mary-Anne.
Sir Robert North Collie Hamilton, 6th Baronet KCB (1802–1887)
Capt. Sir Frederic Harding Anson Hamilton, 7th Baronet (1836–1919), who served in the 60th Rifles and succeeded his father in 1887. On 28 September 1865 at St. George's Church, Montreal he married Mary Jane, daughter of Thomas W. Willan, a barrister of Lincoln's Inn and Clerk of the Crown at Quebec, and his wife Julia, fourth daughter of Hon. Louis Gugy, MLC. The couple had two sons and four daughters.
Maj. Sir Robert Caradoc Hamilton, 8th Baronet (1877–1959)
Sir (Robert Charles) Richard Caradoc Hamilton, 9th Baronet (1911–2001)
Sir Andrew Caradoc Hamilton, 10th Baronet (born 1953)

The heir presumptive to the baronetcy is Paul Howden Hamilton (born 1951).  He is descended from the younger son of the 7th Baronet.

Hamilton baronets, of Donalong and Nenagh (1660) 
The Hamilton Baronetcy, of Donalong in County Tyrone and of Nenagh in County Tipperary, was created in the Baronetage of Ireland in about 1660 for the Hon. George Hamilton. He was the fourth son of James Hamilton, 1st Earl of Abercorn (see the Duke of Abercorn) and the younger brother of the first Baronet of West Port (see above). His grandson, the second Baronet, succeeded as sixth Earl of Abercorn in 1701 and from there on the title became one of the many subsidiary titles of the earls and later marquesses and dukes of Abercorn. See Duke of Abercorn for further history of the title.

Sir George Hamilton, 1st Baronet (c. 1607 – 1679)
Sir James Hamilton, 2nd Baronet (c. 1661 – 1734) who succeeded as the 6th Earl of Abercorn in 1701.

Hamilton baronets, of Monilla (1662) 
The Hamilton Baronetcy, of Monilla, was created in the Baronetage of Ireland on 6 April 1662 for Hans Hamilton. The title became extinct on his death in 1682.

Sir Hans Hamilton, 1st Baronet (died 1682)

Hamilton baronets, of Haggs, Scotland (1670) 
The Hamilton Baronetcy, of Haggs in Scotland, was created in the Baronetage of Nova Scotia on 11 February 1670 for Alexander Hamilton. The title became extinct on the death of the second Baronet in circa 1710.

Sir Alexander Hamilton, 1st Baronet (died before 1700)
Sir Alexander Hamilton, 2nd Baronet (died c. 1710)

Hamilton baronets, of Preston (1673) 
Created in the Baronetage of Nova Scotia on 5 November 1673 for William Hamilton whose father had fought at the Battles of Dunbar and Worcester for Charles II.

See Stirling-Hamilton baronets for further descent.

Hamilton baronets, of Mount Hamilton (1683) 
The Hamilton Baronetcy, of Mount Hamilton in the County of Armagh, was created in the Baronetage of Ireland on 19 February 1683 for Robert Hamilton. The title became extinct on the death of the second Baronet in 1731.

Sir Robert Hamilton, 1st Baronet (died 1703)
Sir Hans Hamilton, 2nd Baronet (1673 – 1731)

Hamilton baronets, of Barnton (1692) 
The Hamilton Baronetcy, of Barnton, was created in the Baronetage of Nova Scotia on 1 March 1692 for George Hamilton. The title became extinct on his death in 1726.

Sir George Hamilton, 1st Baronet (died 1726)

Hamilton baronets, of Rosehall (1703) 
The Hamilton Baronetcy, of Rosehall in the County of Lanark, was created in the Baronetage of Nova Scotia on 10 April 1703 for Archibald Hamilton, a merchant of Edinburgh. He was a descendant of Walter Hamilton, brother of Sir James Hamilton, father of James Hamilton, 1st Lord Hamilton, ancestor of the Dukes of Hamilton and Dukes of Abercorn. He was succeeded by his elder son, the second Baronet. He sat as Member of Parliament for Lanarkshire. He died childless and was succeeded by his younger brother, the third Baronet. On his death in 1755 the baronetcy became dormant.

The first Baronet's brother Sir Robert Hamilton was a Lord of Session under the judicial title of Lord Pressmennan. He was the father of John Hamilton, 2nd Lord Belhaven and Stenton (see Lord Belhaven and Stenton and also the Hamilton Baronetcy of Broomhill above).

Sir Archibald Hamilton, 1st Baronet (died 1709)
Sir James Hamilton, 2nd Baronet (1682–1750)
Sir Hugh Hamilton, 3rd Baronet (died 1755)

Hamilton baronets, of Manor Cunningham (1775) 
The Hamilton Baronetcy, of Manor Cunningham in the County of Donegal, was created in the Baronetage of Ireland on 23 January 1775 for Henry Hamilton. The title became extinct on his death in 1782.

Sir Henry Hamilton, 1st Baronet (c. 1710–1782)

Hamilton baronets, of Marlborough House (1776) 

The Hamilton Baronetcy, of Marlborough House, Portsmouth in the County of Southampton, was created in the Baronetage of Great Britain on 26 August 1776 for John Hamilton, a captain in the Royal Navy who distinguished himself at the Battle of Quebec in 1775. He was the son of John Hamilton, High Sheriff of Kent in 1719, son of William Hamilton (brother of James Hamilton, 6th Earl of Abercorn), one of the "Kentish Petitioners", younger son of Colonel James Hamilton, eldest son of Sir George Hamilton, 1st Baronet, of Donalong and Neneagh (see above), fourth son of James Hamilton, 1st Earl of Abercorn (see Duke of Abercorn). Hamilton's younger son Edward Joseph Hamilton was created a baronet in his own right in 1819 (see Hamilton baronets of Trebinshun House below). He was succeeded by his elder son, the second Baronet. He was an Admiral in the Royal Navy and sat as a Member of Parliament.

On his death the title passed to his son, the third Baronet. He was a Colonel in the British Army. He was succeeded by his first cousin once removed, Sir Edward Archibald Hamilton, 2nd Baronet, of Trebinshun House (see below), who became the fourth Baronet of Marlborough House as well. His eldest son, the fifth/third Baronet died without surviving male issue and was succeeded by his younger brother, the sixth/fourth Baronet. In 2008, with the death of the seventh/fifth Baronet both creations became extinct.

Sir John Hamilton, 1st Baronet (1726–1784)
Sir Charles Hamilton, 2nd Baronet (1767–1849)
Sir Charles John James Hamilton, 3rd Baronet CB (3 April 1810 – 23 January 1892). Hamilton was a British Army officer. He was the son of Sir Charles Hamilton, 2nd Baronet. He was a colonel in the Scots Guards and fought in the Crimean War, most notably at the Battle of Alma. He died 23 January 1892 and is buried in Brompton Cemetery, London. Hamilton was married to Catherine Emily, Lady Hamilton and their son Edward succeeded him.
Sir Edward Archibald Hamilton, 4th and 2nd Baronet (1843–1915)
Sir (Charles Edward) Archibald Watkin Hamilton, 5th and 3rd Baronet (1876–1939)
Sir (Thomas) Sydney Percival Hamilton, 6th and 4th Baronet (1881–1966)
Sir Edward Sydney Hamilton, 7th and 5th Baronet (1925–2008)

Hamilton baronets, of Dunamana (1781) 
The Hamilton Baronetcy, of Dunamana in the County of Tyrone, was created in the Baronetage of Ireland on 1 February 1781 for John Stuart Hamilton. The title became extinct on the death of the second Baronet.

Sir John Stuart Hamilton, 1st Baronet (c. 1740 – 1802)
Sir John Charles Hamilton, 2nd Baronet (died 1818)

Hamilton baronets, of Woodbrook (1814) 
The Hamilton Baronetcy, of Woodbrook in the County of Tyrone, was created in the Baronetage of the United Kingdom on 21 December 1814 for the soldier John Hamilton. The title became extinct on the death of the second Baronet in 1876.

Sir John James Hamilton, 1st Baronet (1755–1835)
Sir James John Hamilton, 2nd Baronet (1802–1876)

Hamilton baronets, of Trebinshun House (1819) 
The Hamilton Baronetcy, of Trebinshun House in the County of Brecon, was created in the Baronetage of the United Kingdom on 26 January 1819 for the naval commander Admiral Edward Hamilton. He was the younger son of Sir John Hamilton, 1st Baronet of Marlborough House (see above). His grandson the second baronet succeeded as the fourth baronet of Marlborough House in 1892. See above for further history of the titles.

Sir Edward Joseph Hamilton, 1st Baronet (1771–1851)
Sir Edward Archibald Hamilton, 2nd Baronet (1843–1915) (succeeded as fourth Baronet of Marlborough House in 1892)
see Hamilton Baronets of Marlborough House above for further succession

Hamilton baronets, of Cadogan Square (1892) 
The Hamilton Baronetcy, of Cadogan Square in the County of London, was created in the Baronetage of the United Kingdom on 21 November 1892 for Charles Hamilton, Conservative Member of Parliament for Rotherhithe. The title became extinct on his death in 1928.

Sir Charles Edward Hamilton, 1st Baronet (1845–1928)

Hamilton baronets, of Ilford (1937) 
The Hamilton Baronetcy, of Ilford in the County of Essex, was created in the Baronetage of the United Kingdom on 10 June 1937 for the Conservative politician Sir George Hamilton. He was the son of the Venerable George Hans Hamilton, Archdeacon of Northumberland and Canon of Durham. He was succeeded by his son Patrick, the second Baronet; he was childless and the title became extinct on his death in 1992.

Sir (Collingwood) George Clements Hamilton, 1st Baronet (1877–1947)
Sir Patrick George Hamilton, 2nd Baronet (1908–1992)

See also 
Stirling-Hamilton baronets

Notes

References

Bibliography 

 

1627 establishments in Nova Scotia
1642 establishments in England
1660 establishments in Ireland
1776 establishments in Great Britain
1814 establishments in the United Kingdom
Baronetcies in the Baronetage of Ireland
Baronetcies in the Baronetage of Nova Scotia
Extinct baronetcies in the Baronetage of England
Extinct baronetcies in the Baronetage of Ireland
Extinct baronetcies in the Baronetage of Great Britain
Extinct baronetcies in the Baronetage of Nova Scotia
Extinct baronetcies in the Baronetage of the United Kingdom